Events in the year 2017 in the Islamic Republic of Iran.

Incumbents
 Supreme Leader of Iran: Ali Khamenei
 President of Iran: Hassan Rouhani 
 Parliament of Iran: Ali Larijani
 Judiciary System of Iran: Sadeq Larijani

Events

January 
 January 8 – Akbar Hashemi Rafsanjani, one of the founding fathers of the Islamic Republic who was the fourth President of Iran, dies.
 January 10 – The state funeral of Akbar Hashemi Rafsanjani in Tehran is attended by millions.
 January 19 – The Plasco Building in Tehran, which was once Iran's tallest building, collapses in a fire.

May 
 May 3 – The Zemestan-Yurt coal mine disaster occurs in Golestan Province, with forty-two individuals dying.
 May 19 – President Hassan Rouhani wins re-election against rival Ebrahim Raisi in the national elections, with 57.14% of the vote going to Rouhani.

June 
 June 7 – Terrorist attacks in Tehran leaves eighteen civilians killed and fifty-two others injured, with the Islamic State of Iraq and the Levant (ISIL) terrorist group claiming responsibility.
 June 9 - Official state funeral for victims of the Tehran attacks is held and attended by multiple Iranian officials.
 June 10 - ISIL operational commander and mastermind of the terrorist events dies at the hands of security forces.

July 
 July 15 - Maryam Mirzakhani, an Iranian mathematician and a professor of mathematics at Stanford University, dies.
 July 28 - Successful Launch of Simorgh Satellite and opening Emam Khomeini Space Station

September

October 
 October 2 – Iran nuclear deal cover by Russia official, US ambassador to UN  warns, Russia is backing shield prevent passed to an agreement.

November 
 November 12 – A magnitude 7.3 earthquake strikes Iran near the border with Iraq, killing at least 630 people and injuring 8,100 others.

December

 December 28 - The 2017 Iranian protests begin.
 December 29 - Protesters take to the streets for a second day against the government in several cities.
 December 30 - Two protesters are reportedly shot dead by riot police in Dorud, Lorestan Province while protests spread further.
 December 31 - Access to Telegram and Instagram were banned following the rising protests. President Rouhani however acknowledges the discontent of the Iranians.

Notable deaths
 January 8 – Akbar Hashemi Rafsanjani, former President of the Islamic Republic of Iran (born 1934)
 July 15 - Maryam Mirzakhani, was an Iranian mathematician and a professor of mathematics at Stanford University. (born 1977)

References

 
2010s in Iran
Years of the 21st century in Iran
Iran
Iran